Mohammad Shoaib Khaliq (born 20 April 1991) is a Pakistani cricketer who has played for Islamabad in Pakistani domestic cricket. He is a left-handed opening batsman.

In January 2010, Shoaib represented the Pakistan under-21s in the cricket tournament at the 2010 South Asian Games, winning a bronze medal. His previous highest level of competition had been for the Islamabad under-19s. Shoaib eventually made his first-class debut for the Islamabad senior team in October 2010, against Pakistan International Airlines in the 2010–11 Quaid-i-Azam Trophy. He has played only irregularly for the team since his debut.

References

External links
Player profile and statistics at CricketArchive
Player profile and statistics at ESPNcricinfo

1991 births
Living people
Islamabad cricketers
Islamabad Leopards cricketers
Pakistani cricketers
Cricketers from Islamabad
South Asian Games bronze medalists for Pakistan
South Asian Games medalists in cricket